Bratachari Vidyasram is a Bengali-medium co-ed school located Thakurpukur, Kolkata. The school was established in 1949 and is affiliated to the West Bengal Board of Secondary Education for Madhyamik Pariksha, and to the West Bengal Council of Higher Secondary Education for Higher Secondary Examination. The school was established in 1949.

References 

High schools and secondary schools in West Bengal
Schools in Kolkata
South 24 Parganas district
Educational institutions established in 1949
1949 establishments in West Bengal